The Galena Territory is a census-designated place in Jo Daviess County, Illinois, United States. Its population was 1,058 as of the 2010 census.  The territory was incorporated on July 26, 1973. The community consists of a private  development located several miles southeast of downtown Galena. The Territory, which is managed by a homeowners association, has set aside  of protected recreational land. The remainder is filled with low-density residential development and Eagle Ridge Resort & Spa.  As of August 2017, there were 4,082 property owners, 554 permanent residences, and 1,675 vacation residences.

Demographics

Facilities
The community includes an owners’ club, which houses recreational facilities for property owners and their guests. The pool and recreation complex includes a fitness center, café, and three pools, along with tennis courts, a basketball court, and a playground. The Galena Territory has also reserved about 1,500 acres of greenspace with over 40 miles of trails running throughout the territory. Several trails take hikers by a historically significant site known as the Belden School, a one room school house built in 1859. These areas are sections of the territory that will be left undeveloped to conserve the natural environment. A riding center offers horseback riding, along with other activities, including trail rides and riding lessons.

Lake Galena & Marina

Lake Galena is a man-made reservoir within the Galena Territory. The lake is mostly used for recreational purposes including boating and fishing. The lake is managed by The Galena Territory Association along with the marina located on the east end of the lake.

Eagle Ridge Resort & Spa

Eagle Ridge Resort & Spa is located lakeside in the center of The Galena Territory.  There are 80 rooms in the main lodge, and over 300 private villas.  The resort is best known for its 63 holes of championship golf, including "The General", which Golf Digest ranked No. 41 in the 2007-2008 "America's 100 Greatest Public Golf Courses."

Government Services 
While the Galena Territory Association operates within its bylaws to administer the area as a property owners' association, the area of the Galena Territory consists of two government townships: East Galena and Guilford Township.  The Galena Territory is covered by three school districts: Galena Unit School District 120, operating a primary, middle and high school for students in East Galena Township, Scales Mound Community Unit School District 211, operating an elementary, junior high, and high school for students in the northern portion of the Galena Territory, and River Ridge Community Unit School District 210, operating an elementary, middle, and high school for the remainder of students and majority of the Galena Territory.  Located inside the Galena Territory is The Galena Territory Fire Station, the Scales Mound Fire Protection District's second station, which provides structural and wildland firefighting, ice and water rescue, and non-transport emergency medical services (EMS) for the majority of the Galena Territory.  The Elizabeth Community Fire Protection District provides firefighting services for a smaller, southern portion of the Galena Territory. Galena Area EMS provides basic life support (BLS) level EMS transport via ambulance for the vast majority of the Galena Territory.  The Jo Daviess County Sheriff’s Office provides primary law enforcement service to residents with assistance from Galena Territory Association's Security Department.

References

Census-designated places in Jo Daviess County, Illinois
Census-designated places in Illinois